Mark Ezra is a film writer, producer, director, actor and published children's author. 
He is most noted for films such as Slaughter High, Steal,
and Waking Ned.

Early life 
Mark is the son of Captain Peter and Italian language coach Gabriella Ezra. He was educated at Ampleforth College and went on to study film production at the University of Westminster.

Film work 
Ezra's horror movie, Slaughter High (1986) (originally April Fool's Day), was picked up by Vestron at the Cannes Film Festival for ten times its production costs.  
He has directed several films, including Savage Hearts (1995), which featured Richard Harris, Julian Fellowes, and Jerry Hall.

Waking Ned (1998), which he co-produced, was picked up by Fox Searchlight and grossed over $100 million.

He wrote the screenplay for Steal (2002), which opened in the number 1 spot in France during the Cannes Film Festival.

His film House Swap (2010) won at the Los Angeles Cinema Festival of Hollywood in the United States.

Filmography

Writing 

The Nth Doctor by Jean-Marc Lofficier includes a chapter on Ezra's Doctor Who script The Return to Varnax.

References

External links 
 

20th-century British writers
20th-century British male actors
People educated at Ampleforth College
Living people
Year of birth missing (living people)
Place of birth missing (living people)